Brenda Yeoh Saw Ai  is a Singaporean academic and geographer, currently serving as Raffles Professor of Social Sciences at the National University of Singapore.

Biography 
In 1985, Yeoh received a Bachelor of Arts in geography from the University of Cambridge, earning a first class honours degree. She went on to read a Diploma in Education from the Institute of Education before completing a stint as a teacher at Victoria Junior College. After leaving the teaching service, she read a DPhil in geography from the University of Oxford, and joined the National University of Singapore as an academic. She joined NUS as a senior tutor in 1987, was made full professor in 2005, and served as the Dean of the Faculty of Arts and Social Sciences from 2010-2016.

In 2000, she received a Fulbright Program scholarship to study at the University of California, Berkeley.

Yeoh is editor of the journal Asian Population Studies and a member of the International Geographical Union’s Population Geography Commission.

Yeoh was accorded the 2021 Vautrin Lud Prize. The award is one of the highest honours presented for developments in geography, and widely considered the 'Nobel Prize in Geography'. In the same year she was elected a corresponding fellow of the British Academy.

References

Living people
Academic staff of the National University of Singapore
Alumni of the University of Oxford
Alumni of the University of Cambridge
Year of birth missing (living people)
Recipients of the Vautrin Lud International Geography Prize